Arthur Bert Kuehn (born February 12, 1953) is a former American football Center in the National Football League for the Seattle Seahawks and New England Patriots.

Kuehn was born in Victoria, British Columbia, Canada. He attended high school at Ellwood P. Cubberley High School in Palo Alto, California. He played college football at UCLA. He was drafted 384th overall in the 1975 NFL Draft by the Washington Redskins. He never played for the Redskins. Instead, he jumped to the Southern California Sun of the World Football League that season.  In the 1976 Expansion draft he was selected by the Seahawks. He would go on to play 99 career games (97 of which were for Seattle) from 1976 through 1983. He finished his career with the Memphis Showboats of the United States Football League, playing two seasons in 1984 and 1985.

References

External links
Career Stats

1953 births
Living people
American football offensive linemen
Canadian players of American football
Canadian people of German descent
New England Patriots players
Sportspeople from Victoria, British Columbia
Seattle Seahawks players
San Jose State Spartans football players
UCLA Bruins football players
Southern California Sun players
Memphis Showboats players